is a professional baseball player from Ōita City, Japan. He is part of the starting rotation for the Hanshin Tigers baseball team.

Career
In 2006, Ando pitched his first Shutout game against Yokohama BayStars.

Ando joined the Japanese Olympic baseball team for the 2004 Summer Olympics, and won a bronze medal.  Ando went 7-4 in college, battling shoulder problems. He went on to Toyota Motors in the industrial leagues and peaked at 93 mph there, drawing the interest of various scouts. In the 2001 Baseball World Cup, he went 2-0 with a 2.45 ERA, allowing 5 hits and fanning 14 in 11 innings.

References

External links

1977 births
Living people
People from Ōita (city)
Baseball people from Ōita Prefecture
Hosei University alumni
Hanshin Tigers players
Baseball players at the 2004 Summer Olympics
Olympic baseball players of Japan
Olympic bronze medalists for Japan
Olympic medalists in baseball
Medalists at the 2004 Summer Olympics
Japanese baseball coaches
Nippon Professional Baseball coaches